Transphobia in the United States has changed over time. Understanding and acceptance of transgender people have both decreased and increased during the last few decades depending on the details of the issues which have been facing the public. Various governmental bodies in the United States have enacted anti-transgender legislation. Social issues in the United States also reveal a level of transphobia. Because of transphobia, transgender people in the U.S. face increased levels of violence and intimidation. Cisgender people can also be affected by transphobia.

American viewpoints on transgender people 
Gender binary norms in the United States are considered rigid and gender nonconforming people can face discrimination, shaming, or other types of gender policing in their daily lives. A 2021 Gallup poll found that 62 percent of Americans believed that transgender people should only play sports on teams that match their gender assigned at birth. Many professional sports leagues in the United States allow transgender players to participate with various types of guidelines and inclusion levels. The Connecticut Interscholastic Athletic Conference allows transgender students to compete according to their gender identities. FINA effectively barred all transgender women from competing in professional women's swimming, with the exception of athletes who "can establish to FINA's comfortable satisfaction that they have not experienced any part of male puberty beyond Tanner Stage 2 (of puberty) or before age 12, whichever is later".

While the majority of Americans supported openly transgender people serving in the military, the number decreased in the same poll taken in 2019, going from 71% to 66%.

Government protections 

In 2020, the Supreme Court of the United States ruled that under Title VII of the Civil Rights Act of 1964, transgender employees are protected from discrimination in the workplace. The Biden administration has created some protections for transgender people in the country. In July 2022, the United States Department of Health and Human Services proposed the restoration of nondiscrimination policies that would protect transgender people.

Anti-trans attitudes 
Those who oppose transgender rights argue that "irresponsible parents" and young people are rushing to make decisions about their trans identities and they also argue that these decisions are based on "social contagion". Conservative activists question the need to talk to children about their gender or sexual identities. Activists who oppose gender-affirming care falsely claim that physicians and parents are putting children through "irreversible medical treatments" without proper safeguards. Some states have pushed for laws banning gender-affirming care by claiming that medical treatment for transgender youth is "child abuse." Social media accounts, such as Libs of TikTok, have helped spread a moral panic about gender-affirming care. Many groups and individuals, despite a lack of evidence for their beliefs, are creating a "culture war" around transgender people.

Some anti-trans activists believe that LGBT ideology will destabilize the United States government and that LGBT people are a "security threat" to the nation. Some people also feel that transgender soldiers are a threat to military readiness.

Some anti-trans activists associate trans women with predatory sexual behaviors. This idea is rooted in second-wave feminism, advocates of it describe trans women as "rapists and boundary-violators trying to invade women's space", while trans men are regarded as "tokens". This has been refuted by research; a study of the effects of Massachusetts' anti-discrimination laws for restrooms found no evidence that cisgender women were placed at risk by the laws. Further, evidence has been found that the risk of assault for transgender children is reduced when they are allowed access to restrooms and locker rooms which match their gender identity.

Others say that their religious beliefs prohibit them from using gender identity in place of "biological sex".

Some socially conservative Americans also conflate people who dress in drag with transgender presentations. Christopher Rufo has implored conservatives to call drag queens "trans strippers", which is an inaccurate description of drag performances. Michigan Republican, Tudor Dixon, has called drag queens "sexualized performers."

20th century 
Before the 1910 publication of Transvestism by Magnus Hirschfeld, most individuals who would now be considered transgender were termed "inverts," a term that also included homosexuals. The term transsexual was described by doctor David Oliver Cauldwell in the American medical literature in 1949. Prior to these medical terminologies, there were categories created by transgender people themselves, such as "men-women" and "women-men." In 1900, a transgender woman, then known as a "man-woman," was killed, and her body salted and stuffed into a trunk by her father. Her story was one of many violent accounts such people faced in the early 20th century.

After 1953, Christine Jorgensen's widely popularized "sex change operation" led to a depiction of her in both medical literature and popular media as a "sick, abnormal" person who was "rescued" by modern medicine.

During the 1960s, transgender people were not welcome in gay bars in San Francisco. By the middle of the 1960s, the Johns Hopkins University created the first "official gender-identity clinic" in the US. The clinic was described by media and press releases as being a project designed to help "unfortunate individuals, trapped in the wrong body" and would "rehabilitate" "deviant" transsexual people.

In the 1970s, the word "transsexual" was often used to describe transgender people. In the medical establishment in the United States, professionals had a pervasive sense of mistrust for their transgender patients. Doctors and psychologists who worked with the trans community had negative feelings about the people they worked with, calling them manipulative and "possibly incapable of love".

During the 1970s, transgender women were frequently rejected in lesbian spaces and they were also accused of being fake women and "male infiltrators". Beth Elliott was discriminated against by the Daughters of Bilitis, who originally allowed her to become a member in 1971, but they later succumbed to pressure to force Elliot out. Robin Morgan was one of the most prominent detractors of Elliot, who she accused of being a man who was "leeching off women", with the "mentality of a rapist". This high-profile attack led to other attacks against other transgender women who attempted to enter other types of women's spaces. Later, Sandy Stone, who had worked at Olivia Records, was subjected to a hate mail campaign which was aimed at getting her fired from the record label.

In 1973, more conservative lesbian and gay men in San Francisco created their own pride parade which "banned transgender people and individuals in drag". In New York City that same year, Jean O'Leary almost provoked a riot when she read a statement in which she denounced drag queens. In response to the event in New York City, the LGBT movement in the United States intensified its marginalization of transgender people.

In 1979, Janice Raymond wrote The Transsexual Empire, which is "often cited as the basis for anti-trans feminism", according to the Progressive. Raymond believed that people chose to become transgender in order to opt out of the sex roles which were assigned to them at birth. Raymond's book affected not only people involved in women's spaces, but also medical professionals. The director of the gender identity clinic at Johns Hopkins closed down his clinic after he and his secretary published a biased study about transgender people in 1979. It was later found that individuals at the organization pushed for the closure of the program due to personal reasons.

During the 1980s, transgender people, still more often known as transsexuals, were "treated as sick, perverse, abnormal," in society in the US. This continued into the 1990s, where individuals who do not adhere to "normal" gender roles lack a "safe social space." Thomas Szasz describes transsexualism in the 1980s in his book, Sex by Prescription as a type of castration. Szasz also felt that the diagnosis of transsexualism was too medicalized and that it was more important to look at the nature of the condition itself. Despite the criticism by Szasz and others, the idea of transsexualism as a medical disorder helped people in the medical profession to accept the idea more readily.

The Michigan Womyn's Music Festival did not allow transgender women at their events and kicked out a transsexual woman in 1991. Transsexual women were also banned from the 1991 National Lesbian Conference. Transgender people were also quietly excluded from the March on Washington for Lesbian, Gay and Bi Equal Rights and Liberation in 1993.

In 1993, Brandon Teena was raped and later killed after his transgender identity was revealed. Two men that Teena had thought were his friends were the assailants. The reporting on Teena's murder was also transphobic, often misgendering him.

Tyra Hunter was injured in 1995 in Washington, D.C. and the paramedics who responded stopped treating her and instead made fun of her because she was transgender. Hunter later died because of the injuries and no charges were made against the paramedics.

In 1996, a trans man, Robert Eads, discovered that he had ovarian cancer. Eads experienced medical discrimination with gynecologists refusing to treat him until 1997. The cancer, however, had progressed too far and Eads died in 1999.

To honor the memory of transgender people who have been lost to violence, Gwendolyn Ann Smith created the first Transgender Day of Remembrance in 1999.

21st century

Government actions 
When the federal Employment Non-Discrimination Act was proposed in 2007, it contained language protecting sexual orientation and gender identity. However, the sponsors eventually removed gender identity protections because President George W. Bush said he would veto the bill if they were included.

Arkansas passed the 2015 Intrastate Commerce Improvement Act which prohibited local governments from enacting laws protecting LGBTQ people at greater levels than are already afforded at the state level. Because Arkansas does not provide protections for LGBTQ people at the state level, this bans local governments from also protecting LGBTQ individuals as well. In addition, this act was passed right after Fayetteville, Arkansas worked to pass civil rights protections for LGBTQ people in the city.

In 2016, when a large number of "bathroom bills" were proposed in the country, the result was that all women faced harassment due to increased policing on who was using what bathroom. In Kansas, a proposal was created that would give students $2,500 as a bounty for reporting trans people using unapproved restrooms. Washington State proposed a similar law which would allow students to sue their schools for $2,500 if they "encounter a trans person in the bathroom." In March 2016, North Carolina passed their bathroom bill, the Public Facilities Privacy & Security Act, which led to a national outcry and several large businesses threatening not to do business in the state. Later in 2016, a case, Franciscan Alliance v. Burwell, was filed which sought to have regulations protecting trans people accessing healthcare struck down.

On February 20, 2017, the Trump administration "withdrew guidance...stating federal law requires transgender students to have access to bathrooms and locker rooms matching their gender identity." In July of the same year, President Trump announced a ban on transgender people serving in the United States military. In October 2018, Trump proposed a roll back of civil rights protections in healthcare for transgender people.

The first state to ban transfeminine athletes from participating in youth sports was Idaho. On March 30, 2020, the bill was signed by Governor Brad Little. During 2020, 16 other states also drafted bills that were similar to the one passed in Idaho. In 2020, the Alliance Defending Freedom (ADF) filed a lawsuit to challenge Connecticut's rule allowing transgender students to participate in youth sports according to their gender identity. In 2021, the case was dismissed, though the ADF has said they will appeal the decision.

In 2021 and 2022, a "historic wave of bills" targeting transgender people were developed and proposed in state legislatures around the country. This amounted to around 200 bills, all proposed by Republican lawmakers. Governor Tate Reeves signed a bill in 2021 that banned transgender students from participating in school sports that match their gender identities. Governor Kristi Noem in March 2021 issued an executive order banning trans girls from girls' sports teams in South Dakota. Arkansas passed a bill in April 2021 blocking youth from accessing gender-affirming care.

Legislators in Alabama created a bill in February 2022 that would require transgender students in grades K-12 to use the restroom matching the sex on their birth certificate. April 2022, Alabama Governor Kay Ivey signed a bill that would make gender-affirming care for youth a felony. Later, that bill was blocked from going into effect with a partial injunction from the state court. State attorneys in Alabama have vowed to appeal the ruling and believe that there is no constitutional right to gender affirming healthcare for children or adults.

In March 2022, Florida Governor Ron DeSantis signed the Florida Parental Rights in Education Act, which banned the ability to discuss sexual orientation or gender identity in a classroom setting for specific grades. Also in 2022, Iowa created a bill to prevent transgender youth from participating in sports matching their gender identity.

In February 2022, Governor Greg Abbott declared transitioning and HRT to be "child abuse" and ordered Child Protective Services (CPS) to investigate parents who allowed their children to transition. Texas Attorney General, Ken Paxton, started the attack by issuing an opinion that gender-affirming care was a form of child abuse. Paxton also requested a list from the Texas Department of Public Safety of all people who "had switched the gender identifer on their Texas driver's license within the past two years." The order from Abbott and Paxton also required that therapists report any clients receiving gender-affirming care. In Dallas, one hospital stopped providing gender-affirming care at their facility after Abbott's directive was made public and Texas Children's Hospital also stopped providing HRT. Several families were investigated by CPS after the directive was ordered. In June 2022, a judge from Travis County blocked these kinds of investigations into families with transgender kids. Due to these attacks on transgender children and youth, many families began to look for ways to leave the state. A political strategist for Greg Abbott said that attacking transgender children is a "winning issue" for the governor as he runs for office again.

In May 2022, a Title IX investigation took place at a Wisconsin school when several middle school students allegedly misgendered another student. The case received attention from conservative media outlets, including The Laura Ingraham Show. The investigation was dismissed after the school and much of the city of Kiel, Wisconsin received bomb threats.

In June 2022, the Texas Republican Party adopted bans for gender-affirming care as part of their party platform. Later, the Texas GOP claimed that drag shows are more of a threat to children than guns. Michigan Republicans proposed a bill in June 2022 that would let parents sue any public school that allowed their children to see a drag show. DeSantis, in Florida, worked on taking away Medicaid coverage for gender-affirming care from transgender people of any age. Ohio passed a law in June that requires "genital inspections" if a girl or woman is suspected of being transgender.

In July 2022, attorneys general from twenty states, including Alabama, Alaska, Arizona, Arkansas, Georgia, Indiana, Kansas, Kentucky, Louisiana, Mississippi, Missouri, Montana, Nebraska, Ohio, Oklahoma, South Carolina, South Dakota, Tennessee, Texas, Utah, Virginia, and West Virginia filed suit against the United States Department of Agriculture over their prohibition of discrimination against LGBTQ people receiving school meals. This included discrimination against gender identity. In Florida, state education officials told schools to "disregard recent guidance from the Biden administration" that would help protect transgender students under Title IX. Florida Education Commissioner, Manny Diaz Jr., called the guidance regarding transgender protections "woke insanity." In mid-July, the GOP in the US House of Representatives supported bills that would target transgender athletes with the "Protection of Women and Girls in Sports Act" sponsored by Greg Steube. Late in July 2022, Governor Ron DeSantis used a 1947 Florida Supreme Court Decision as guidance in his complaint over a drag show. DeSantis alleged that the drag venue violated a public nuisance law.

Marjorie Taylor Greene, a US Representative, introduced a bill called Protect Children's Innocence Act in August 2022 that would make providing gender-affirming care to minors a class C felony. The bill specifies sending anyone who provides such care a prison sentence of 10 to 25 years and would also prohibit the use of federal funds for gender affirming care. This would effectively stop anyone who is using Affordable Healthcare Act plans from accessing gender affirming care.

In September 2022, high school students from the East Baton Rouge Parish Public Schools were told that they were attending a college fair for a school field trip. Instead of a fair, they were taken to a church where transgender students faced bullying and discrimination. In October of 2020, an intersex transgender woman was arrested after she filed a police report in Bexar County describing her alleged assault. She was outed to the police, who later put her in the male block of the jail. As of December 2022, she and local community groups are asking for dropped charges and sensitivity training for the police. In November of 2022, the Florida medical board restricted most gender-affirming care for minors.

In preparation of the Texas legislative session in January 2023, Republican lawmakers have pre-filed bills that will target transgender people and make gender-affirming care illegal for youth. By January 19, 2023, over 124 bills were introduced that would target LGBTQ and transgender people in the U.S. In Florida, a number of transphobic bills were introduced in February of 2023. Bills filed targeted drag shows, gender-affirming care, libraries containing LGBTQ books, and one bill would prohibit teachers from using a students' preferred pronouns. In Tennessee early in March of 2023, Governor Bill Lee signed a law banning minors from watching drag shows, despite his own participation in drag as a school boy. On March 3, Florida submitted SB254 which would allow the state to take away children from parents who allow gender-affirming care for them, even if they live outside of the state.

Transphobia in US culture 
In 2001, the Daily News ran a column by John Leo which complained about transgender people, suggesting that they had a mental disorder. Leo argued against the idea that securing civil rights and gender-affirming care for transgender people was good for them. Instead he wanted them to get psychiatric treatment. Leo called the word, transphobia, "a new word of indignant accusation."

In 2019, Ditch the Label published an analysis of 10 million online social media and forum posts from a time period starting around 2016. This analysis revealed a large amount of transphobic language and ideas being shared in the United States. Many of the transphobic ideas and commentary have been shared on Facebook, which left-leaning media watchdog Media Matters called "one of the biggest bad actors" in this area. The Daily Wire was also involved in spreading misinformation about transgender people online during this time, using transphobia to increase engagement with their website.

The Westboro Baptist Church protested at Morehouse College in 2019 when the school allowed trans men to enroll for the first time.

During the Conservative Political Action Conference (CPAC) held in 2021, Caitlyn Jenner found herself attacked by attendees who deadnamed her and called her names.

Dave Chappelle's 2021 Netflix special, The Closer, contained jokes that some considered transphobic. Chappelle's live shows continue to receive protests from people who oppose the way he has talked about transgender people.

In March 2022, Senator Marsha Blackburn used the confirmation hearing of Judge Ketanji Brown Jackson to bring up "transgender issues," asking whether transgender women should be allowed to compete in sports with cisgender women.

When Jeopardy! champion, Amy Schneider, threw the first pitch at Oracle Park in June 2022, Fox Sports cut away from her and showed a first pitch from NASCAR driver Kurt Busch instead. The cut from the first pitch was pointed out on Twitter where it was seen as transphobic. Fox Sports says that "first pitches are never aired as part of their game broadcasts," and showing Busch was part of a "promotional package for an upcoming NASCAR race." Sports Illustrated argued that no matter the reason for showing Busch instead of Schneider, the "optics" of the situation did not paint Fox Sports in a good light. In May 2022, State Farm faced attacks from conservative activists over their GenderCool Project which would donate children's books with LGBTQ themes to schools and libraries. The project was meant to "raise awareness around what it means to be transgender, inclusive and nonbinary." Due to the backlash, State Farm dropped the project.

In June 2022, pride month, The Daily Wire commentator Matt Walsh released a documentary called What Is a Woman?. Walsh is also the publisher of the children's book Johnny the Walrus, which allegorically compares being transgender to pretending to be a walrus. 

Media Matters reported that on the first day of pride month alone there were eight instances of transgender people being disparaged on Fox News, especially transgender swimmer Lia Thomas.

In August 2022, right-wing Twitter account Libs of TikTok falsely claimed that Boston Children's Hospital was performing hysterectomies and other gender affirming surgeries on "young girls." The false claim was picked up by many, becoming viral and reaching high-profile conservatives such as Stephen Miller. Other high-profile celebrities who have promoted Libs of TikTok included Joe Rogan, Donald Trump Jr., and Tucker Carlson.

In September 2022, Matt Walsh made accusations against Vanderbilt University Medical Center in Tennessee, saying that doctors "drug," "castrate," and "mutilate" children. Walsh also asserted that VUMC performed gender-affirming care because it is a "money-maker," threatened doctors who refused to perform the procedures with "consequences," and "enforced compliance" within patients hesitant with receiving the procedures. Tennessee Republicans, including Governor Bill Lee, called for an immediate investigation of the clinic. Walsh stated he was meeting with lawmakers to pass a bill that would shut the clinic down. In response to the accusations, VUMC shut down the webpage for their transgender clinic and said that Walsh "misrepresent[ed] facts" about the care provided.

In Nashville, Tennessee on October 21, 2022, The Daily Wire organized a rally titled "The Rally to End Child Mutilation" in protest to gender-affirming care for minors. Between 1,500 to 3,000 people attended, which included supporters, protesters, and Tennessee senators and representatives.

Violent incidents and threats 
In October 2002, transgender teen, Gwen Araujo, was beaten and then strangled at a house party in Newark. Her assault took place after she was discovered to be transgender and the men responsible used the "trans panic" defense in their murder trial.

CeCe McDonald was assaulted outside a bar in 2011 in Minneapolis. When a fight broke out, McDonald was stabbed and one of her attackers was killed during the fight. McDonald was charged with second-degree murder, despite having acted in self-defense. She accepted a plea agreement and spent two years in a men's prison.

Kiwi Farms was created in 2013 in order to target people who are neurodivergent or members of the LGBTQ+ community. Users of Kiwi Farms would find people on the internet to stalk, dox, and harass. The "site has been blamed for the deaths of several victims," many of whom were transgender.

In 2019, 25 transgender or gender nonconforming people died after they were subjected to acts of violence. 2021 became one of the "deadliest on record in America," for transgender and gender nonconforming people in the United States with 29 deaths by June and at least 50 by the end of the year.

Children's Medical Center Dallas was forced to close their gender affirming program for trans children and teens in November 2021 after protests and harassment from anti-transgender activists.

The Tenacious Unicorn Ranch, an all-transgender farm in Colorado, faced alleged armed threats on March 6, 2021. After this event, Kiwi Farms facilitated further harassment of the ranchers online. In 2022, the Kiwi Farms forum had over 800 posts targeting the ranch.

On March 24, 2022, former Mississippi legislator, Robert Foster, used Twitter to express his opinion that allies of transgender people should be "lined up against [a] wall before a firing squad to be sent to an early judgment." Foster did not apologize for his tweet, instead saying that the law should be changed to allow such executions. In June 2022, Mark Burns, a pastor and a candidate running in South Carolina, said that allies, teachers, and parents who support LGBTQ+ rights should be arrested and executed.

In June 2022, a drag brunch in Arlington, Texas was targeted by alleged Proud Boys, as was a California library that same month. At the San Francisco Bay Area event, "The [Proud Boys] were described as extremely aggressive with a threatening violent demeanor causing people to fear for their safety." The Proud Boys may have been tipped off by Libs of TikTok.

In July 2022, a cafe in Chicago that was planning to host a drag performance was vandalized. Libs of TikTok was also involved in a campaign to target Jewish summer camps in California that accepted transgender children. The camps had to take additional "steps to ensure security." 

In the same month, 20-year-old transgender man Noah Ruiz was assaulted by three men while camping in Camden, Ohio. After being advised to use the women's restroom, despite identifying as male, he was angrily confronted by a woman in the bathroom before she stormed out. Upon exiting, he was approached by three men, who proceeded to beat him up while reportedly using homophobic slurs. When Preble County sheriff's deputies arrived, Ruiz was arrested for "disorderly conduct and obstructing official business"; The Preble Country Sheriff claimed they weren't aware of the assault, and that Ruiz was highly intoxicated and belligerent. Ruiz was able to file an assault report with the sheriff's office, demanding the men to be held accountable.

Boston Children's Hospital (BCH) staff received "violent threats" in August 2022 after Libs of TikTok incorrectly claimed that children were receiving hysterectomies. The Children's National Hospital was also targeted in late August by Libs of TikTok, which also falsely claimed the hospital was performing hysterectomies on children. The National hospital received both bomb and death threats on social media. Both Facebook and Twitter have not suspended Libs of TikTok, despite the large volume of harassment BCH has received because of the targeting. Fox News and The Daily Caller both ran stories using the false information Libs of TikTok spread. Children's hospitals in Pittsburgh and Phoenix were also targeted. On August 30, a bomb threat caused the hospital to go into lockdown and another threat, phoned in on September 9, brought in the police to investigate. A woman from Westfield, Massachusetts was arrested on September 15 for charges of making one of the bomb threats to BCH. The FBI reported that there have been "well over a dozen" such threats made to BCH. On September 18, 2022, "Billboard Chris," an anti-LGBT activist from Canada, organized a protest of the hospital's gender affirming care program outside of BCH. Between 100 and 200 counter-protesters came to support the transgender care at the hospital, outnumbering the protesters. The American Academy of Pediatrics (AAP), the American Medical Association (AMA), and the Children's Hospital Association (CHA) have asked U.S. Attorney General Merrick Garland to "investigate the organizations, individuals, and entities coordinating, provoking, and carrying out bomb threats and threats of personal violence against children's hospitals and physicians across the U.S."

When Tucker Carlson on Fox News covered the accusations against Vanderbilt University Medical Center, he showcased photos of the doctors' faces along with their names. VUMC reported harassment against their doctors from far-right groups on Reddit and 4chan, calling for them to be either arrested or murdered. These groups also called for "Nazi-inspired intimidation tactics" such as book burnings.

A cisgender woman named Jay was harassed in a Las Vegas casino bathroom in October 2022 by another woman who mistook her for being transgender due to her short haircut. The woman followed Jay into the bathroom and was "ranting about people's gender identities" for several minutes outside her stall. Upon exiting, the woman interrogated her about her gender identity and threatened to have police arrest her. The woman was kicked out of the casino, but no charges were pressed, and she was later allowed back in. Jay recorded the incident and uploaded it to TikTok, where it went viral. The video was later removed by the site for "grooming behavior," to which Jay contested. She commented on how no bystanders tried to help her, calling it "the most upsetting part" of the whole incident.

On November 19, 2022, the Colorado Springs Club Q shooting took the lives of 5 people and injured 25 others. The club was considered a safe place for transgender people in the city. During the December 14, 2022 Congressional hearing, LGBTQ+ shooting survivors shared their fears about the "rising hate" towards their community, especially towards people who are transgender or who perform in drag.

During the March 2023 Conservative Political Action Conference, Daily Wire contributor Michael Knowles stated that “transgenderism should be eradicated from public life entirely.” Knowles’ comments sparked outrage, and were characterized as genocidal by various media figures and outlets.

Effects 
Transgender people are subject to minority stress. This type of stress is created through stigma, prejudice, and discrimination. Many transgender people face bullying and harassment in many different venues in their lives. Transphobia is manifested through a "hostile political climate" and by marginalizing transgender individuals in society. Around 78 percent of transgender students in grades K through 12 described various types of harassment from other students, teachers, or school staff. Transgender people who testified against anti-transgender bills in the Texas Capitol found the long hearings "exhausting and upsetting."

The legal actions and politics that have been passed against transgender youth have caused negative mental health outcomes for many young people. This can include high rates of suicidal ideation. Even if the bills do not pass, the stress of seeing the measures debated causes issues for many people. Crisis calls to The Trevor Project have seen high rates in states like Texas in 2022. In 2017, there was also an increase in calls to the crisis hotline after Texas considered a bathroom bill that year. Some families are looking to move out of states that have passed transphobic legislation. Some transgender people have to file lawsuits over laws, such as bathroom bills, which restrict their civil rights.

Many transgender people have difficulty accessing health care. According to a 2008 study conducted by the National Center for Transgender Equality, around 19 percent of the respondents reported being refused care by healthcare professionals because they were transgender. Transgender and gender diverse people may also avoid accessing healthcare due to their "fear of mistreatment" and lack of provider knowledge. In some situations, transphobic campaigns can prevent people from accessing health care. During a targeted campaign against Boston Children's Hospital, patients were unable to reach providers by phone.

Transphobia in the United States can also lead to higher rates of unemployment and discrimination in the workplace. Transgender and gender diverse people have twice the unemployment rates in the US when compared to the general population.

Cisgender people can experience the effects of transphobia. In August 2022, a school investigated a girl who "outclassed" the rest of her peers in a high school sporting event. The parents of the girls who placed second and third complained to the Utah High School Activities Association (UHSAA) where they "questioned the winner's gender." UHSAA investigated the girl, opening up her enrollment records back to kindergarten, all without informing the student or her family.

Effects of violence and intimidation 
Recently, hate violence has increased in the United States. The Human Rights Campaign started to document acts of "fatal violence" against transgender and gender nonconforming people in the United States in 2013. Most of the victims of this transphobic violence are Black gender non-conforming and trans women. Black transgender people are also more likely to face discrimination. In Chicago, fewer deaths of transgender women than homicides overall are solved by police. Transgender people are more likely to be the victims of violent crime.

Because of the threats of violence the  Tenacious Unicorn Ranch has faced, they have security on their property. All staff carry guns and visitors are provided bulletproof vests.

Threats made against children's hospitals that provide gender affirming care affect a wide range of people. During a 2022 lockdown due to transphobic threats, a mother was unable to visit her newborn in the neonatal intensive care unit (NICU).

Link to conspiracy theories 
Many transphobic conspiracy theories share antisemitic themes. White nationalists believe that Jews and transgender people are jointly plotting to commit a "white genocide." Both groups are portrayed as "elites" which are "controlling society" and need to be removed from it by any means necessary. The Occidental Observer wrote that the transgender rights movement was a "form of Jewish warfare."

In Canada and the United States in the early 2020s, several conservative and far-right media outlets and personalities promulgated the litters boxes in schools hoax, stating that some schools were providing litter boxes in bathrooms to students who identified as cats or furries, in response to several school districts enacting accommodations for transgender students. Many news outlets and academic researchers have debunked the litter box claims as false.

See also 

 Anti-gender movement
 Bathroom bill
 Feminist views on transgender topics
 History of transgender people in the United States
 Homophobia
 Lavender scare
 Legal status of transgender people#United States
 LGBT grooming conspiracy theory
 LGBT rights in the United States
 Trans bashing
 Transgender military ban in the United States
 Transgender people and military service
 Transgender people in sports
 Transphobia

References

Sources

External links 

 "'I Just Try to Make it Home Safe': Violence and the Human Rights of Transgender People in the United States." Published November 18, 2021, by Human Rights Watch

United States
Discrimination in the United States
Transgender in the United States
Transgender history in the United States
Discrimination against LGBT people in the United States
LGBT history in the United States